Pirbulaq (known as Novospasovka until 1991) is a village in the Gadabay Rayon of Azerbaijan.  The village forms part of the municipality of Ərtəpə.

References 

Populated places in Gadabay District